John McEnroe was the defending champion, but did not participate this year.

McEnroe successfully defended his title, defeating Anders Järryd 6–1, 6–2 in the final.

Seeds

Draw

Finals

Top half

Bottom half

References

 Main Draw

Stockholm Open
1985 Grand Prix (tennis)